Lido Town is a census town in Tinsukia district in the Indian state of Assam.

Demographics
 India census, Ledo Town had a population of 8572. Males constitute 52% of the population and females 48%. Ledo Town has an average literacy rate of 71%, higher than the national average of 59.5%: male literacy is 77%, and female literacy is 65%. In Ledo Town, 10% of the population is under 6 years of age.

References

Cities and towns in Tinsukia district
Tinsukia